Carlos Vélez Rieckehoff (November 18, 1907 – November 19, 2005) was the President of the New York chapter of the Puerto Rican Nationalist Party in the 1930s. In the 1990s Rieckehoff was among the protesters against the United States Navy's use of his birthplace, the island of Vieques, as a bombing range. He stood in front of the committee of the U.S. House of Representatives investigating the situation in Vieques and pleaded for the return of Vieques to the people of Puerto Rico.

Early years

Rieckehoff was born Máximo Carlos Vélez Rieckehoff in Vieques, Puerto Rico. His maternal ancestors emigrated from Germany and settled in Vieques. He was raised in a homestead owned by his parents whom, although poor farmers ("jíbaros") were able to provide him with his basic needs and a good education. He was a first cousin of German Rieckehoff, a follower of the Puerto Rican independence movement himself, who became the president of the Puerto Rican Olympic committee.

Nationalist

In the 1930s, Vélez Rieckehoff moved to New York City in search of employment. On one occasion a fifteen-year-old boy handed him a Puerto Rican Nationalist Party pamphlet and he became interested in the Puerto Rican independence movement. Rieckehoff attended the party meetings and eventually became the president of the New York chapter of the Nationalist Party.

Vélez Rieckehoff returned to Puerto Rico where he had the opportunity to become acquainted with Don Pedro Albizu Campos, the president of the Nationalist Party. With Albizu Campos he learned to have pride in his heritage and a willingness to sacrifice his life and safety, if necessary, for the cause of independence. On one occasion Vélez Rieckehoff attempted to seize a Puerto Rican flag, from an organization he felt was not in genuine sympathy with what the flag stood for. The police gave chase and he barely escaped with his life. In the 1940s, Vélez Rieckehoff found work in a sugar cane ranch. During this period of his life he met and later married Luisa Guadalupe, a young lady also from Vieques.

During World War II, the United States military purchased about two thirds of Vieques as an extension to the Puerto Rican mainland's Roosevelt Roads Naval Station. The original purpose of the base, though never implemented, was to provide a safe haven for the British fleet should Britain fall to Nazi Germany. Much of the land was bought from the owners of large farms and sugar cane plantations, who were paid a pittance for their homes and given twenty-four hours to evacuate. The purchases triggered the final demise of the sugar industry in Vieques. Many agricultural workers, who had no title to the land they occupied, were evicted. Among those who were forced out of their jobs was Vélez Rieckehoff who, together with his wife, went to New York to seek employment. In New York he drove a truck, worked as a night watchman, whatever work he could find while his wife, Luisa, worked in a factory.

After the war, the US Navy continued to use the island for military exercises, as a firing range, and a testing ground for bombs, missiles, and other weapons in a manner not unlike Kahoolawe in the Hawaiian Islands.

Imprisonment
On May 21, 1948, a bill was introduced before the Puerto Rican Senate which would restrain the rights of the independence and Nationalist movements on the archipelago. The Senate, which at the time was controlled by the Partido Popular Democrático (PPD) and presided by Luis Muñoz Marín, approved the bill that day. This bill, which resembled the anti-communist Smith Act passed in the United States in 1940, became known as the Ley de la Mordaza (Gag Law) when the U.S.-appointed governor of Puerto Rico, Jesús T. Piñero, signed it into law on June 10, 1948.

Under this new law it became a crime to print, publish, sell, or exhibit any material intended to paralyze or destroy the insular government; or to organize any society, group or assembly of people with a similar destructive intent. It made it illegal to sing a patriotic song, and reinforced the 1898 law that had made it illegal to display the Flag of Puerto Rico, with anyone found guilty of disobeying the law in any way being subject to a sentence of up to ten years imprisonment, a fine of up to US$10,000, or both. According to Dr. Leopoldo Figueroa, the only non-PPD member of the Puerto Rico House of Representatives, the law was repressive and was in violation of the First Amendment of the US Constitution which guarantees Freedom of Speech. He pointed out that the law as such was a violation of the civil rights of the people of Puerto Rico.

On June 10, 1948, a bill was introduced before the Puerto Rican Senate which would restrain the rights of the independence and nationalist movements in the island. The Senate at the time was controlled by the PPD and presided by Luis Muñoz Marín. The Bill, also known as the "Ley de la Mordaza" (gag Law), made it illegal to display a Puerto Rican flag, to sing a patriotic tune, to talk of independence, and to fight for the independence of the island. The Bill which resembled the anti-communist Smith Law passed in the United States, was signed and made into law on June 11, 1948, by the U.S.-appointed governor of Puerto Rico, Jesús T. Piñero and became known as "Ley 53" (Law 53). In accordance to the new law, it would be a crime to print, publish, sale, to exhibit or organize or to help anyone organize any society, group or assembly of people whose intentions are to paralyze or destroy the insular government. Anyone accused and found guilty of disobeying the law could be sentenced to ten years of prison, be fined $10,000 dollars (US) or both. According to Dr. Leopoldo Figueroa, a member of the Puerto Rico House of Representatives, the law was repressive and was in violation of the First Amendment of the US Constitution which guarantees Freedom of Speech. He pointed out that the law as such was a violation of the civil rights of the people of Puerto Rico.

In the 1950s, Nationalist meetings were outlawed. When Vélez Rieckehoff and other members of the party were detained by the police and asked about their political affiliations, he acknowledged that he was a member of the Nationalist Party. Rieckehoff was arrested, along with Don Pedro Albizu Campos and other Nationalists, and served three years in prison.

Vieques situation

In 1980, Vélez Rieckehoff presented himself in front of the committee of the U.S. House of Representatives investigating the situation in Vieques. He pleaded for the return of Vieques to the people. He also stated that the very seizure of Puerto Rico through the Treaty of Paris of 1898 was null, since Puerto Rico had already been granted autonomy from Spain. He compared the invasion of Puerto Rico to the attempt of Russia to take over Finland in the 19th century. He pointed out that an international conference examining the issue had determined that "the rights of a country to national liberty is free from war conquests and diplomatic treaties."

The continuing postwar presence in Vieques of the United States Navy drew protests from the local community, angry at the expropriation of their land and the environmental impact of weapons testing. He stated the following:

The locals' discontent was exacerbated by the island's parlous economic condition. In May 2003 the Navy withdrew from Vieques, and much of the island was designated a National Wildlife Refuge under the control of the United States Fish and Wildlife Service.

Legacy
In 1979, Vélez Rieckehoff attended the International Conference in Support of Independence for Puerto Rico held in Mexico City as acting president of the Nationalist Party while the president of the party Jacinto Rivera was in Spain.

Vélez Rieckehoff was among a group of citizens who helped in the restoration of the Fuerte Conde de Mirasol (Count of Marisol Fort) of Vieques, under the direction of Robert Rabin the cofounder of the Historical Archives of Vieques.

On November 19, 2005 Vélez Rieckehoff died in Vieques. In December 2007, an art exhibit was held at the Museum Fuerte Conde de Mirasol, and the opening ceremonies of the museum were dedicated to the memory of Carlos Vélez Rieckehoff.

Further reading
"War Against All Puerto Ricans: Revolution and Terror in America’s Colony"; Author: Nelson Antonio Denis; Publisher: Nation Books (April 7, 2015); .

See also

Puerto Rican Nationalist Party Revolts of the 1950s
 List of Puerto Ricans
 German immigration to Puerto Rico
 Germán Rieckehoff

Notes

References

1907 births
2005 deaths
People from Vieques, Puerto Rico
Puerto Rican people of Spanish descent
Puerto Rican people of German descent
Puerto Rican Nationalist Party politicians
Members of the Puerto Rican Nationalist Party
Imprisoned Puerto Rican independence activists